Sephisa chandra, the eastern courtier, is a species of nymphalid butterfly found in South and Southeast Asia.

Gallery

Notes

 "Sephisa Moore, 1882" at Markku Savela's Lepidoptera and Some Other Life Forms

Apaturinae
Butterflies of Asia
Butterflies described in 1856